Roger Tilbury Memorial Park is a public park in the Portland, Oregon metropolitan area.

References

External links

 Roger Tilbury Memorial Park at Tualatin Hills Park & Recreation District

Parks in Washington County, Oregon